This page lists all described species of the spider family Oecobiidae accepted by the World Spider Catalog :

† Lebanoecobius

† Lebanoecobius Wunderlich, 2004
 † L. schleei Wunderlich, 2004 — Cretaceous Lebanese amber

† Mizalia

† Mizalia Koch and Berendt, 1854
 † M. blauvelti Petrunkevitch, 1942  — Palaeogene Baltic amber
 † M. gemini Wunderlich, 2004  — Palaeogene Baltic amber
 † M. rostrata Koch and Berendt, 1854 (type) — Palaeogene Baltic amber
 † M. spirembolus Wunderlich, 2004 — Palaeogene Baltic amber

Oecobius

Oecobius Lucas, 1846
 O. achimota Shear & Benoit, 1974 — Ghana
 O. aculeatus Wunderlich, 1987 — Canary Is.
 O. affinis O. Pickard-Cambridge, 1872 — Lebanon
 O. agaetensis Wunderlich, 1992 — Canary Is.
 O. albipunctatus O. Pickard-Cambridge, 1872 — Syria
 O. alhoutyae Wunderlich, 1995 — Kuwait
 O. amboseli Shear & Benoit, 1974 — Egypt, Ethiopia, Kenya, Uganda, Rwanda. Introduced to Denmark, Netherlands, Belgium
 O. annulipes Lucas, 1846 — Algeria
 O. ashmolei Wunderlich, 1992 — Canary Is.
 O. beatus Gertsch & Davis, 1937 — Mexico
 O. bracae Shear, 1970 — Mexico
 O. brachyplura (Strand, 1913) — Israel
 O. b. demaculatus (Strand, 1914) — Israel
 O. bumerang Wunderlich, 2011 — Canary Is.
 O. caesaris Wunderlich, 1987 — Canary Is.
 O. cambridgei Wunderlich, 1995 — Lebanon
 O. camposi Wunderlich, 1992 — Canary Is.
 O. cellariorum (Dugès, 1836) (type) — Mediterranean, Russia (Europe), Azerbaijan, Jordan, Iran. Introduced to USA, China, Japan
 O. chiasma Barman, 1978 — India
 O. civitas Shear, 1970 — Mexico
 O. concinnus Simon, 1893 — Brazil to Mexico and USA (Florida). Introduced to Seychelles, Laos, Japan (Ogasawara Is.)
 O. culiacanensis Shear, 1970 — Mexico
 O. cumbrecita Wunderlich, 1987 — Canary Is.
 O. depressus Wunderlich, 1987 — Canary Is.
 O. dolosus Wunderlich, 1987 — Canary Is.
 O. doryphorus Schmidt, 1977 — Canary Is.
 O. duplex Wunderlich, 2011 — Canary Is.
 O. eberhardi Santos & Gonzaga, 2008 — Costa Rica
 O. erjosensis Wunderlich, 1992 — Canary Is.
 O. fahimii Zamani & Marusik, 2018 — Iran
 O. ferdowsii Mirshamsi, Zamani & Marusik, 2017 — Iran
 O. fortaleza Wunderlich, 1992 — Canary Is.
 O. fuerterotensis Wunderlich, 1992 — Canary Is.
 O. furcula Wunderlich, 1992 — Canary Is.
 O. gomerensis Wunderlich, 1980 — Canary Is.
 O. hayensis Wunderlich, 1992 — Canary Is.
 O. hidalgoensis Wunderlich, 1992 — Canary Is.
 O. hierroensis Wunderlich, 1987 — Canary Is.
 O. hoffmannae Jiménez & Llinas, 2005 — Mexico
 O. idolator Shear & Benoit, 1974 — Burkina Faso
 O. iguestensis Wunderlich, 1992 — Canary Is.
 O. ilamensis Zamani, Mirshamsi & Marusik, 2017 — Iran
 O. incertus Wunderlich, 1995 — North Africa
 O. infierno Wunderlich, 1987 — Canary Is.
 O. infringens Wunderlich, 2011 — Canary Is.
 O. interpellator Shear, 1970 — USA
 O. isolatoides Shear, 1970 — USA, Mexico
 O. isolatus Chamberlin, 1924 — USA, Mexico
 O. juangarcia Shear, 1970 — Mexico
 O. kowalskii Magalhães & Santos, 2018 — Madagascar
 O. lampeli Wunderlich, 1987 — Canary Is.
 O. latiscapus Wunderlich, 1992 — Canary Is.
 O. linguiformis Wunderlich, 1995 — Canary Is.
 O. longiscapus Wunderlich, 1992 — Canary Is.
 O. machadoi Wunderlich, 1995 — Portugal, Spain
 O. maculatus Simon, 1870 — Mediterranean to Azerbaijan. Introduced to USA
 O. marathaus Tikader, 1962 — Tropical Africa. Introduced to Brazil, India, Laos, Taiwan, Japan, Australia (Queensland)
 O. maritimus Wunderlich, 1987 — Canary Is.
 O. minor Kulczyński, 1909 — Azores, Madeira
 O. nadiae (Spassky, 1936) — Azerbaijan, Iran, Afghanistan, Turkmenistan, Tajikistan, China
 O. navus Blackwall, 1859 — Europe, northern Africa, Caucasus. Introduced to South Africa, China, Korea, Japan, New Zealand, Canada, USA, South America
 O. palmensis Wunderlich, 1987 — Canary Is.
 O. parapsammophilus Wunderlich, 2011 — Canary Is.
 O. pasteuri Berland & Millot, 1940 — West Africa
 O. paulomaculatus Wunderlich, 1995 — Algeria
 O. persimilis Wunderlich, 1987 — Canary Is.
 O. petronius Simon, 1890 — Yemen
 O. piaxtla Shear, 1970 — Mexico
 O. pinoensis Wunderlich, 1992 — Canary Is.
 O. przewalskyi Hu & Li, 1987 — Tibet
 O. psammophilus Wunderlich, 2011 — Canary Is.
 O. pseudodepressus Wunderlich, 1992 — Canary Is.
 O. putus O. Pickard-Cambridge, 1876 — Egypt, Sudan to Iran, Azerbaijan, Afghanistan, India. Introduced to USA, Mexico
 O. rhodiensis Kritscher, 1966 — Greece (incl. Crete), Turkey
 O. rioensis Wunderlich, 1992 — Canary Is.
 O. rivula Shear, 1970 — Mexico
 O. rugosus Wunderlich, 1987 — Canary Is.
 O. selvagensis Wunderlich, 1995 — Selvagens Is.
 O. sheari Benoit, 1975 — Chad
 O. similis Kulczyński, 1909 — Madeira, Canary Is., Azores, St. Helena
 O. simillimus Wunderlich, 2011 — Canary Is.
 O. sinescapus Wunderlich, 2017 — Canary Is.
 O. sombrero Wunderlich, 1987 — Canary Is.
 O. tadzhikus Andreeva & Tystshenko, 1969 — Tajikistan, Turkmenistan
 O. tasarticoensis Wunderlich, 1992 — Canary Is.
 O. teliger O. Pickard-Cambridge, 1872 — Greece, Turkey, Lebanon
 O. templi O. Pickard-Cambridge, 1876 — Egypt, Sudan
 O. tibesti Shear & Benoit, 1974 — Chad
 O. trimaculatus O. Pickard-Cambridge, 1872 — Israel
 O. unicoloripes Wunderlich, 1992 — Canary Is.
 † O. piliformis Wunderlich, 1988

Paroecobius

Paroecobius Lamoral, 1981
 P. nicolaii Wunderlich, 1995 — South Africa
 P. private Magalhães & Santos, 2018 — Madagascar
 P. rico Magalhães & Santos, 2018 — Madagascar
 P. skipper Magalhães & Santos, 2018 — Madagascar
 P. wilmotae Lamoral, 1981 (type) — Botswana

Platoecobius

Platoecobius Chamberlin & Ivie, 1935
 P. floridanus (Banks, 1896) (type) — USA
 P. kooch Santos & Gonzaga, 2008 — Argentina

† Retrooecobius

† Retrooecobius Wunderlich, 2015 - †Retrooecobiinae

Uroctea

Uroctea Dufour, 1820
 U. compactilis L. Koch, 1878 — China, Korea, Japan
 U. concolor Simon, 1882 — Yemen
 U. durandi (Latreille, 1809) (type) — Mediterranean
 U. gambronica Zamani & Bosselaers, 2020 — Iran
 U. grossa Roewer, 1960 — Iran, Tajikistan, Turkmenistan, Afghanistan
 U. hashemitorum Bosselaers, 1999 — Jordan
 U. indica Pocock, 1900 — India
 U. lesserti Schenkel, 1936 — China, Korea
 U. limbata (C. L. Koch, 1843) — Senegal to North Africa, Middle East to Central Asia
 U. manii Patel, 1987 — India
 U. matthaii Dyal, 1935 — Pakistan
 U. multiprocessa Z. Z. Yang & Zhang, 2019 — China
 U. paivani (Blackwall, 1868) — Canary Is., Cape Verde Is.
 U. quinquenotata Simon, 1910 — South Africa
 U. schinzi Simon, 1887 — Namibia, South Africa
 U. semilimbata Simon, 1910 — Namibia, South Africa
 U. septemnotata Tucker, 1920 — Namibia, South Africa
 U. septempunctata (O. Pickard-Cambridge, 1872) — Israel
 U. sudanensis Benoit, 1966 — Sudan, Somalia, Yemen
 U. thaleri Rheims, Santos & van Harten, 2007 — Turkey, Israel, Iran, Yemen, India
 U. yunlingensis Z. Z. Yang & Zhao, 2019 — China
 † U. galloprovincialis Gourret, 1887 — Palaeogene Aix-en-Provence Limestone

Urocteana

Urocteana Roewer, 1961
 U. poecilis Roewer, 1961 (type) — Senegal

Uroecobius

Uroecobius Kullmann & Zimmermann, 1976
 U. ecribellatus Kullmann & Zimmermann, 1976 (type) — South Africa

† Zamilia

† Zamilia Wunderlich, 2008 - †Retrooecobiinae
 † Z. aculeopectens Wunderlich, 2015 — Cretaceous Burmese amber
 † Z. antecessor Wunderlich, 2008 (type) — Cretaceous Burmese amber
 † Z. quattuormammillae Wunderlich, 2015 — Cretaceous Burmese amber

References

Oecobiidae